Mukhyamantri or Mukhyamanthri are romanisations of the word for chief minister in several Indian languages. It may refer to:

 Mukhyamantri (film), a 1996 Indian Bengali-language film
 Mukhyamantri Chandru, an Indian actor and politician who worked in the Kannada film industry

See also
 Mukhia (disambiguation)
 Mantri